Andromachus was the ruler of Tauromenium (modern Taormina) in eastern Sicily in the middle of the 4th century BCE, and the father of the historian Timaeus.

Biography 
Tauromenium (Ταυρομένιον) had been founded ca. 396 BC by the Carthaginian general Himilco. In 392, Dionysius of Syracuse captured Tauromenium and refounded it as a Greek city.

In 358 BC, Andromachus gathered a troop of Naxian refugees who had been expelled from their homes by Dionysius, and they took the city back. His son, Timaeus, was born ca. 356 or 350. Andromachus is said to have maintained control at Tauromenium through moderate rule.

In 344, he assisted Timoleon in his expedition against Dionysius (Diod. xvi. 7, 68; Plut. Timol. 10). He remained in power at Tauromenium after Timoleon liberated Sicily.

References

Bibliography

See also
 History of Taormina

Sicilian Greeks
Sicilian tyrants
4th-century BC Greek people
4th-century BC rulers